"I Wanna Pick You Up" is a song by American rock band the Beach Boys from their 1977 album The Beach Boys Love You. It was written by Brian Wilson and features lead vocals from Dennis Wilson.

Lyrics
According to Brian Wilson, "I Wanna Pick You Up" demonstrates how he had "worked specifically at getting the lyrics right" for the Love You album. He explained that the song is about "a man who considers this chick a baby. [...] she's too big to pick up, of course. But he wants to; he wants to pretend she's small like a baby: He really wants to pick her up!"

At the end of the song, the singer instructs the listener to "pat, pat, pat her on her butt, butt / She's gone to sleep, be quiet". Biographer Peter Ames Carlin felt that the song concerns an "object of desire" that is "either a disturbingly sexualized infant or a dismayingly infantilized adult."

Recording
"I Wanna Pick You Up" was tracked on October 13, 1976, at Brother Studios. Dennis Wilson sings the majority of the lead vocals on the song with brother Brian joining him on the second half of the verses and the chorus.

Cover versions
In the 1990s, the song was covered by Darian Sahanaja in the production style of Pet Sounds with an introductory keyboard arrangement similar to the opening of The Beach Boys' "You Still Believe In Me," and an ending with vocal harmonies borrowed from a "Heroes And Villains" outtake that were eventually used on the Brian Wilson Presents Smile version of the song. Sahanaja's cover of "I Wanna Pick You Up" was released as a b-side of the Brian Wilson penned "Do You Have Any Regrets". The single was pressed on blue vinyl with a label parodying X Records, the label that released The Beach Boys' first single, "Surfin'".
In 2000 the song was covered by Alex Chilton for the compilation album Caroline Now!.

References

1977 songs
The Beach Boys songs
Songs written by Brian Wilson
Synth-pop ballads
Songs about parenthood